St. Joseph Plantation is a historic plantation located on the west bank of the Mississippi River in the town of Vacherie, St. James Parish, Louisiana, United States of America. It is listed on the National Register of Historic Places.

St. Joseph Plantation is located at 3535 Hwy 18 Vacherie, LA 70090, adjacent to Oak Alley Plantation and up-river from Laura Plantation.  The plantation was first owned by Josephine Aime Ferry in 1830, but the Ferry family sold it to Joseph Waguespack (1802-1892) in 1877 (Waguespack's son, Aubert Florian, owned Laura Plantation). In 1890 Saturnine Waguespack merged St. Joseph Plantation with Felicity Plantation to form the St. Joseph Plantation and Manufacturing Company.  It is today maintained by descendants of the Waguespack and Simon families.

References

External links

St. Joseph Plantation - official site

Houses completed in 1840
Creole architecture in Louisiana
Houses on the National Register of Historic Places in Louisiana
Plantations in Louisiana
Historic house museums in Louisiana
Museums in St. James Parish, Louisiana
Houses in St. James Parish, Louisiana
National Register of Historic Places in St. James Parish, Louisiana
1840 establishments in Louisiana